Geumjeongsanseong (literally Geungjeong Mountain Fortress or Geumjeong Fortress) is the largest mountain fortress in the Republic of Korea today. It is located on Geumjeongsan in the Busan Metropolitan City.

Following the Japanese invasion of 1592 and the Manchu invasion in 1627 and again in 1637, awareness of the necessity of national defence was heightened, especially against attacks from the sea. As a result of this awareness, this fortress was built in the 29th year (1703) of the reign of King Sukjong. The inner and the outer walls were mainly built of natural stones, but weak portions were reinforced with artificially worked square stone blocks. The walls are about 17 kilometers in length and from 1.5 meters to 3 meters in height. The area surrounded by the fortress is about 8.2 square kilometers.

It is clear that fortresses had been already built on this site before 1700. Yi Chi-hong, a naval commander, left a record in 1667 in which he mentions traces of an old fortress on the site. The construction of the fortress began in 1701 at the recommendation of Jo Tae-dong, the Governor of Gyeongsang-do, and was completed in 1702. In 1707 the walls were built around the main structure of the fortress. This fortress fell to disuse because it was too large to maintain. After lying empty for a century, it was repaired in 1807, the seventh year of the reign of King Sunjo. Oh Han-won, the Dongnae Magistrate, took the responsibility for building the west gate in 1807, and the other gates the following year. There is a stele recording the building of the gates.

The fortress was destroyed during the Japanese occupation (1910-1945), but began to be restored in 1972. The East, West and South gates were restored by 1974 and the north gate was rebuilt in 1989. Today, thanks to the restoration efforts, much of the walls and the four gates still stand. Of the 4 existing observation towers, the tower number 1 (제1망루) located on the south-west side was destroyed by the typhoon Rusa on the morning of September 1, 2002. The area around the South Gate is a popular resting place. The West Gate, even though it is the most impressive of the four, is the less frequented one due to its lack of accessibility.

Restoration work 
Since much of the fortress had been destroyed during the Japanese occupation, restoration work was started in 1972. In 1974 The East, West and South Gates were restored and the North Gate was rebuilt in 1989.

More restoration works, commissioned by the Busan City Council, are currently under way. This restoration is taking place over a period of 15 years and is divided in 3 phases of 5 years between 1996 and 2010.
 Phase 1 (1996–2000) covers the west region, going from the North Gate down to the West Gate.
 Phase 2 (2000–2005) covers the section of wall on the east side, running between the North Gate and the East Gate. It include the observation towers 3 and 4.
 Phase 3 (2006–2010) covers everything south of the West and East Gates, including the South Gate and the observation towers 1 and 2.

References 

Tourist attractions in Busan
Castles in South Korea
Culture of Busan
Buildings and structures in Busan